A market is mature when it has reached a state of equilibrium. A market is considered to be in a state of equilibrium when there is an absence of significant growth or a lack of innovation. When supply matches demand the price decided by those market forces is called equilibrium price". Equilibrium price prevails in the market for a substantial period, which may be from one day to one week or several months.

See also
 Mature technology

References

Market (economics)